The Labor Day 1969 UFO Incident occurred on the night of September 1, 1969 in Berkshire County, Massachusetts when over 250 people reported witnessing a UFO. The incident has been deemed a "significantly historic and true event" by the Great Barrington Historical Society and Massachusetts historians.

Alleged off-world incidents

The most famous encounter from this incident occurred in Sheffield near Old Covered Bridge. Thomas Reed and his family were crossing the bridge when they saw a disc-shaped object hovering in the air. Reed described the craft as a "white orb" that was "bigger than a football field". They tried escaping the UFO by continuing to drive down Covered Bridge Lane, but the craft followed them. Reed says the car was engulfed in light as they were pulled into the UFO. When Reed took a polygraph test, he was found to be 99.1% truthful.

Another alleged off-world incident that happened occurred at Lake Mansfield in Great Barrington. Melanie Kirchdorfer and her family had gone to the lake, and when her father backed into the parking lot a very bright light engulfed their car. Everyone in the car began to panic. Her father decided to chase the light, despite Melanie begging him not to. She and her sister began to shake in fear. Her sister did not remember anything after that. However, she remembered levitating and then being on a ship. She then remembered being laid out while in it. Tom Warner remembered seeing Melanie to the right of him on the ship. He recalled seeing total fear on her face. However, she did not remember seeing him. She recalled being in a room with several other children. Suddenly, the other children began to disappear, one by one. After that, she woke up at the lake by herself. She then had to walk home. Meanwhile, Tom remembered at the same time being laid down on his back at the other end of his family's property.

UFO Monument Park

A park was founded in 2015 on the banks of the Housatonic River by the town of Sheffield where Thom Reed's off-world incident occurred to commemorate the incident. A 5,000 pound granite monument was placed in the park from 2015 until 2019, when it was replaced by a sign which reads "On behalf of the citizens of Commonwealth of Massachusetts, I am pleased to confer upon you this Governor's citation in recognition of the off-world incident on September 1, 1969, which engaged the Reed family, which has been established. Your dedicated service to this incident was factually upheld, founded, and deemed historically significant and true by means of Massachusetts historians. The records highlighting the historic event are now officially part of the Great Barrington, MA Historical Society's collection and your recent induction into Massachusetts history." The plaque was signed in error by then-Governor Charlie Baker after a persistent Reed asked the governor's staff to put Baker's signature on it, a Baker spokesman said.

In popular culture

The Netflix reboot of Unsolved Mysteries dedicated an entire episode to the incident.

The YouTube channel Yes Theory made a documentary about the UFO incident with interviews from people who saw the UFOs. The documentary has over 6 million views as of September 24, 2022."

References

UFO sightings in the United States
1969 in Massachusetts